James Clifford Turpin (6 May 1886 – January 1966) was a pioneer aviator with the Wright Exhibition Team.

Biography
He was born on May 6, 1886.

He attended Purdue University, the first graduate(class of 1908) to receive a pilot's license. Turpin joined the Wright Exhibition team in 1910, flying demonstrations across the country. The group was disbanded in 1911. In May 1912, Turpin rented a Wright Model C for his own exhibitions. While flying his Fowler-Gage biplane in a Seattle stadium, Turpin clipped an iron railing whilst avoiding a cameraman, and veered into a grandstand, killing two spectators.  After the death of his flying partner, Phil Parmalee, in Yakima, Washington, Turpin quit flying. 

He died in January 1966. He was buried in Lothrop Hill Cemetery in Barnstable, Massachusetts. Turpin reputedly was the father of one daughter.

External links

Washington's first airplane fatality occurs at the Meadows Race Track in Georgetown on May 30, 1912.

References

1886 births
1966 deaths
Members of the Early Birds of Aviation
Wright brothers
Aviation accidents and incidents in 1912